Relampago is a fictional character, a comic book superhero self-published by creator Judge Margarito C. Garza. The character made his first appearance in Relampago! #1 (Feb. 17, 1977) making him the first Mexican American superhero in the American comic book industry. The character's debut series only ran for three issues, ultimately ending with the passing of Judge Garza 1995. A planned revival series by comic creator Richard Dominguez was later scrapped as he was unable to gain the consent of the surviving Garza family.

Publication history
District court Judge Margarito Garza conceived of Relampago shortly after attending a comic convention. Garza, who had grown frustrated with seeing the same crimes being committed, had created the hero as a way to exercise fantasies of stopping crime. Noticing a lack of representation at the time, he also decided to make the character Tejano, believing that the Mexican-American youth needed a superhero of their own. With the help of his wife Jean, Relampago became a more well-rounded character embodying both Catholic and Mexican folklore. As the character further developed, Judge Garza sent letters to Marvel and DC Comics telling them of his creation, but both companies showed little interest. Garza would later try to get a listing in a comic pricing guide, but the publishers said the character was "too obscure". The Judge decided to maintain the comic in a self-published print, becoming more of a personal project than a money-making venture.

Garza published the first issue of Relampago in 1977. Only 1,000 copies of the original book were printed and many of them destroyed soon after due to concerns of possible copyright infringement, making it a rarity among collectors. Garza enlisted the aid of Sam G. Gonzales for the next two issues, all released later in the same year with all publications coming to a halt soon after the release of the third issue. Several years later, the comic attracted the attention of Richard Dominguez, a Dallas illustrator, who found an issue of the comic in a half-price book store. Intrigued, Dominguez contacted Garza through his comic book shop and the two formed a close friendship. At this time Relampago hadn't been in published print since its last issue in December 1977. Judge Garza had wanted to revive the series for some time and Dominguez offered his services as an artist. To prove himself to the Judge, Dominguez created his own comic book titled El Gato Negro in 1993. Garza realized how serious Dominguez was and agreed to collaborate on a new Relampago series with a planned cross-over issue featuring their respective heroes. This collaboration never came to be however, with the death of Judge Garza in 1995.

Fictional character history
Shot while robbing an elderly man's home, Marcos Zapata escaped from the scene of the crime severely wounded. Having heard of the dark arts practiced by La Bruja Mendoza, Marcos stumbled to the Mendoza's doorstep. Pleading for help, the young bandit died on her doorstep. Realizing an opportunity, La Bruja revived Marcos before death could claim him. She bathed him in special lotions, fed him bitter broths, and applied herbs to his body. Soon after, Marcos discovered himself to be an "invincible man", having super strength, super speed, and invulnerability. His physical appearance changed as well, making him more athletic and physically attractive. His life now belonged to La Bruja Mendoza, who bade him to steal for her. Believing he owed her that much, Marcos stole for the old witch. He eventually grew tired of stealing and was intent on leaving the witch. Mendoza herself was brutally beaten by thieves intent on stealing her ill-gotten goods. Left for dead in her burning home, Marcos managed to save La Bruja Mendoza. In her final moments of life Marcos pleaded, "These powers, this strength, are these gifts permanent or are they only temporary?" But Mendoza's pain proved too great to bear, her last words being "The powers are as permanent only as..." The following week, Marcos would arrange a proper burial for Mendoza with the aid of a local church. Renouncing his checkered past, Marcos decided to use his new-found gifts for good, creating the alter ego of Relampago and fighting against crime.

Powers, abilities and resources
Relampago’s powers include superhuman strength, increased speed and agility, as well as near invulnerability. The extent of his superhuman strength and invulnerability are not known but he has been shown to stop a speeding vehicle with his bare hands as well as recovering quickly after falling from tremendous heights. While unable to fly, Relampago is able to leap to great heights and distances and has been known to use a grappling hook to scale tall buildings.

References

Azteca Productions characters
Comics publications